Carry On Constable is a 1960 British comedy film, the fourth in the series of 31 Carry On films (1958–1992). It was released in February 1960. Of the regular team, it featured Kenneth Connor, Kenneth Williams, Charles Hawtrey, Joan Sims, and Hattie Jacques. Sid James makes his debut in the series here, while early regulars Leslie Phillips, Eric Barker, and Shirley Eaton also turn up, although Phillips did not appear again in the series for 32 years. It was the first "Carry On..." film to include some nudity with Connor, Hawtrey, Williams, and Phillips baring their behinds during a shower scene.

Plot
A suburban police station is understaffed due to a flu epidemic, and Sergeant Wilkins, under pressure to maintain staffing levels, is pleased to hear that three new recruits, straight from training school, are due shortly.

Before even arriving, the three policemen inadvertently assist some bank robbers into their getaway car, and are embarrassed when they learn the truth. The new constables are self-proclaimed intellectual and amateur psychologist PC Timothy Benson, former socially well-connected playboy and cad PC Tom Potter, and extremely superstitious PC Charles Constable. The arrival of WPC Gloria Passworthy, with whom Constable falls in love, and Special Constable Gorse completes the roster.

Out on the beat, the new constables try hard, but are less than successful. Benson nearly arrests a plainclothes detective, and Constable believes he has heard a murder being committed, but it turns out to be a radio play. Potter investigates a report of an intruder, but finds a young woman in the bath and engages in a civil conversation with her about her recently broken relationship. Gorse, tasked to patrol with a police dog, is unable to control it. They have better luck when a wages robbery takes place. Benson and Potter locate the getaway car, and all four engage in a confrontation with the thieves, arresting them and recovering the money.

Commended for his efficiency and excellent results, Inspector Mills is promoted to a training position and Wilkins is promoted to replace him. Charlie Constable gets his girl (with a little help from Sgt Moon) and stops being superstitious.

Cast

Sid James as Sergeant Frank Wilkins
Eric Barker as Inspector Mills
Kenneth Connor as Constable Charlie Constable
Charles Hawtrey as Special Constable Timothy Gorse
Kenneth Williams as PC Stanley Benson
Leslie Phillips as PC Tom Potter
Joan Sims as WPC Gloria Passworthy
Hattie Jacques as Sergeant Laura Moon
Shirley Eaton as Sally Barry
Cyril Chamberlain as PC Thurston
Joan Hickson as Mrs May
Irene Handl as Distraught Mother
Terence Longdon as Herbert Hall
Jill Adams as WPC Harrison
Freddie Mills as Jewel thief
Brian Oulton as Store manager
Victor Maddern as Detective Sergeant Liddell
Esma Cannon as Deaf old lady
Hilda Fenemore as Agitated woman
Lucy Griffiths as Miss Horton
Noel Dyson as Vague woman
Dorinda Stevens as Young Woman

Crew
Screenplay – Peter Rogers & Norman Hudis
Story – Norman Hudis
Idea – Brock Williams
Music – Bruce Montgomery
Art Director – Carmen Dillon
Director of Photography – Ted Scaife
Editor – John Shirley
Production Manager – Frank Bevis
Camera Operator – Alan Hume
Assistant Director – Peter Manley
Sound Editor – Leslie Wiggins
Sound Recordists – Robert T MacPhee & Bill Daniels
Continuity – Joan Davis
Make-up – George Blackler
Hairdressing – Stella Rivers
Dress Designer – Yvonne Caffin
Set Dressing – Vernon Dixon
Casting Director – Betty White
Producer – Peter Rogers
Director – Gerald Thomas

Role of Sergeant Wilkins
Initially, the role of Sergeant Wilkins was intended for Ted Ray following his work on the previous film Carry On Teacher. However, Ray was contracted to ABC (despite being unused by them), who distributed the Carry On films to cinemas. Unhappy seeing one of their contracted actors in a rival production, they threatened to stop distribution, so Peter Rogers reluctantly dropped him from the films and replaced him with Sid James, thus beginning James's 19-film long membership of the Carry On team.

Filming and locations

Filming dates – 9 November-18 December 1959

Interiors:
 Pinewood Studios, Buckinghamshire

Exteriors:
 The streets of Ealing, London
The exterior of the police station is Hanwell Library, Cherrington Road, W7. Other scenes were filmed along the parade of shops on The Avenue in West Ealing, W13, with the Drayton Court Hotel visible in many scenes. The Royal Mail Sorting Office in Manor Road and the railway footbridge over the GWR out of West Ealing is also seen as still standing today. Other scenes were filmed on and around St Mary's Road (including St Mary's Church) and the surrounding streets, Ealing W5. The store used was F.H. Rowse department store. The building was demolished in the early 1980s and was situated on the junction of Green Man Lane and Uxbridge Road in Ealing.

Release 
The fourth film in the classic British comedy film series, Carry On Constable premiered at London's Plaza cinema on 25 February 1960.

Reception

Box Office
It was the third most popular film at the British box office in 1960, after Doctor in Love and Sink the Bismarck!.

Critical
Variety wrote, "At times it seems that the team is hard put to it to keep up the laughter pressure but, all in all, this achieves its objective of providing harmless merriment." Geoffrey M. Warren of the Los Angeles Times noted, "Most of the gags are visual in the tradition of Laurel and Hardy, the Marx Bros. and others, though no individual performer is of this caliber of comic performer." He went on, though, to praise director Gerald Thomas for having "accomplished a remarkable amount of good cinema here. The situations are worked to perfection and always held within the limits of the possible, if just barely." The Monthly Film Bulletin wrote, "The 'Carry On' series looks like becoming an anthology of all the slap-and-tickle music-hall jokes that have ever been cracked. The laughter here centres on dropped trousers, ample bosoms, innuendoes, female impersonation, lingerie and male nudity. Out of this frayed material a little comedy is coaxed by the familiar cast as they grapple with the random situations that pass for a plot."

Bibliography

Keeping the British End Up: Four Decades of Saucy Cinema by Simon Sheridan (third edition) (2007) (Reynolds & Hearn Books)

References

External links

Carry On Constable at The Whippit Inn
Carry On Constable at BFI Screenonline

1960 films
Carry On films
1960s English-language films
British crime comedy films
British black-and-white films
Films directed by Gerald Thomas
1960s crime comedy films
Films shot at Pinewood Studios
Films produced by Peter Rogers
Films with screenplays by Norman Hudis
1960 comedy films
1960s British films